South Carolina Highway 73 may refer to:

South Carolina Highway 73 (1920s): a former state highway from Fort Mill to Indian Land
South Carolina Highway 73 (1930s): a former state highway from Brownsville to Dillon
South Carolina Highway 73 (1939–1942): a former state highway from Latta to near Fork
South Carolina Highway 73 (1940s): a former state highway from southwest of Allendale to Sycamore
South Carolina Highway 73: a former state highway from Springmaid Beach to Myrtle Beach

073 (disambiguation)